Čejetice is a municipality and village in Strakonice District in the South Bohemian Region of the Czech Republic. It has about 900 inhabitants.

Administrative parts
Villages of Mladějovice, Sedlíkovice, Sedliště and Sudoměř are administrative parts of Čejetice.

Geography
It lies in the České Budějovice Basin. The municipal territory is very rich in fish ponds, the establishment of which has a long history here.

History

The first written mention of Čejetice is from 1289.

Sudoměř is known for the Battle of Sudoměř, which took place between the ponds Škaredý and Markovec during the Hussite Wars in 1420.

Sights
It was created in 1925.

Twin towns – sister cities

Čejetice is twinned with:
 Oberwil im Simmental, Switzerland

References

External links

Villages in Strakonice District